is one of the traditional forty throws of judo as developed by Kano Jigoro. Kata guruma belongs to the third group of the traditional throwing list in the Gokyo no waza of the Kodokan Judo.  It is also part of the current 67 Throws of Kodokan Judo.  Because the technique is not a sweep nor a trip and requires tori to pull uke into a carry, it is categorized as a hand throwing technique (tewaza).

Description 
In The Essence of Judo, Kyuzo Mifune demonstrates three variations of kata guruma. In the second variation, Mifune steps behind uke, and in the third he steps behind uke and grabs ukes left leg instead. In all three variations, uke is lifted up to toris shoulder behind toris head, and then dropped forward (as in the above clip).  The drop kata guruma is a variant of kata guruma. Ronda Rousey uses a variation in WWE where she drops opponents backwards like a Samoan drop. Because the most common versions of kata guruma involve a grip below the belt/touching the legs, these variations are now illegal under the current International Judo Federation rules (as of 2019).

See also
 The Canon Of Judo
 Fireman's carry
 Judo technique

References

Further reading

External links 

 Information on the Techniques of Judo
 Collection of Kata Guruma Videos
 Alabama Judo Federation video channel: https://www.youtube.com/watch?v=ZWkqmG4QY4Q
 Demonstrated from http://www.suginoharyu.com/html/index.html
 Randori from http://www.suginoharyu.com/html/video/sambo.htm
 http://video.google.com/videoplay?docid=3748489073060595313, Kyuzo Mifune performed one version of kata guruma that is much higher, almost standing, and only bows down at the actual throw at the 9:56 mark.

Articles containing video clips
Grappling hold
Grappling positions
Judo technique
Martial art techniques
Throw (grappling)